National Sheep Industry Improvement Center — The Federal Agriculture Improvement and Reform Act of 1996 (P.L. 104-127) established a revolving fund of up to $50 million, to be used by a new, eventually privatized, center that aims to revive the declining U.S. sheep and goat industries through loans and loan guarantees for such activities as improving production and marketing methods, purchasing new equipment, and modernizing processing facilities.

External links
Website.

Sheep farming in the United States
Agricultural organizations based in the United States
Meat industry organizations